Peter L. Corsell (born December 5, 1977) is an American technology entrepreneur and investor. A repeat entrepreneur in the sustainable energy industry, Corsell founded GridPoint in 2003, and Twenty First Century Utilities in 2015.

Early life and education
Corsell was born in Brooklyn, New York and raised in Manhattan. Corsell attended the Edmund A. Walsh School of Foreign Service at Georgetown University where he earned a BSFS degree in 2000.
 
In 1999, Corsell was recruited by the Central Intelligence Agency, where he worked as an intelligence officer in the Cuba branch. From early 2001 to late 2002, Corsell worked for the U.S. Department of State in Cuba, where he served as Special Assistant to Ambassador Vicki J. Huddleston, the Principal Officer of the United States Interests Section in Havana.

Career

GridPoint
At age 25, Corsell founded GridPoint, a clean technology company, to develop energy management, energy storage, and renewable energy technologies. GridPoint was initially focused on R&D, developing a valuable portfolio of foundational intellectual property in the energy management, energy storage and electric vehicle charging segments.

During the company's first decade, GridPoint worked with electric utility companies to develop a smart grid technology platform to integrate distributed "behind-the-meter" load measurement and control devices, battery storage technologies, and renewable energy sources into the electric grid via an intelligent communications network.
 
During the last decade, GridPoint focused primarily on the commercial buildings sector, which had become a faster adopter of the company’s technology than electric utilities. GridPoint’s enterprise customers include Walgreens, Chipotle and the U.S. Postal Service.

During his tenure at GridPoint, Corsell raised over $200 million from Goldman Sachs and several venture capital firms, increasing the company's market value by twelve times within five years to $800 million in 2008. He was featured in several books including Hot, Flat, and Crowded by Thomas Friedman, Perfect Power by Bob Galvin and Kurt Yeager, Earth: The Sequel by Fred Krupp, The Clean Tech Revolution by Ron Pernick and Clint Wilde, and The Plot to Save the Planet: How Visionary Entrepreneurs and Corporate Titans Are Creating Real Solutions to Global Warming by Brian Dumaine.
 
He served as the company’s CEO from 2003 until 2010, when he unexpectedly resigned and sold most of his shares alongside Goldman Sachs in advance of the clean tech crash. Corsell was succeeded as CEO by longtime Berkshire Hathaway executive Todd Raba, who previously ran the MidAmerican Energy Company and is currently Chairman of the MISO board.

Five years later, in November 2015, Corsell's investment firm, Twenty First Century Utilities, acquired control of GridPoint for $62.5 million, enabling Corsell to retake control of his company.

In 2018, GridPoint adopted a recurring revenue model and partnered with Shell to launch a subscription offering for commercial buildings that required no upfront capital from customers.

In 2021, Inc. Magazine named GridPoint among the fastest-growing private companies in America with 184% revenue growth between 2017 and 2020.

In February 2022, Goldman Sachs returned to the company, leading a $75 million strategic investment with additional participation from Shell.

Twenty First Century Utilities 
In 2015, after a five-year absence from the energy industry, Corsell cofounded Twenty First Century Utilities ("TFC Utilities") with former Goldman Sachs partner Larry Kellerman, who led the firm's electric power investment business between 2002 and 2010. TFC Utilities was an investment firm focused on acquiring and modernizing power generation assets and electric utility companies. In June 2016, Corsell and TFC Utilities cofounder Larry Kellerman appeared on the Charlie Rose show to discuss the ways in which TFC Utilities was contributing to the clean energy industry.
 
In November 2015, Corsell's investment firm, Twenty First Century Utilities acquired control of GridPoint for $62.5 million, enabling Corsell to retake control of the company. In 2017 and 2018, TFC Utilities completed multiple power purchase agreement (PPA) restructurings and was reported to be exploring electric utility acquisitions in Hawaii, South Carolina, and Bermuda.

In July 2019, TFC Utilities was acquired by I Squared Capital, a global infrastructure investment firm with $35 billion of assets under management in the energy, utilities, telecom, transport, and social infrastructure investments. Corsell is currently Global InfraTech Fund Partner at I Squared Capital, where he led the creation and execution of the firm’s technology investment strategy.

In January 2021, I Squared announced the acquisition of Atlantic Power on the TFC Utilities platform for $961 million; the deal closed in May 2021.  Atlantic Power Corporation is a leading power generation and infrastructure company with a portfolio of assets in the United States and Canada. TFC Utilities then merged into Atlantic Power. Corsell is currently Chairman of the Board of Directors at Atlantic Power and Utilities.  Corsell is also the Global InfraTec Fund Partner at I Squared Capital.

Other ventures
Corsell has been a cofounder, board member and investor in several technology companies focused on clean technology, enterprise software, and cybersecurity.

In 2011, Corsell co-founded Hubub, an online community in which users created multimedia channels containing articles, images, and videos on topics of interest. In partnership with Bell Media, Hubub developed a significant following in Canada, and was featured in a 2015 Super Bowl commercial. In 2016, Hubub was acquired by Stagwell, a $3 billion digital marketing services conglomerate founded by Mark Penn and backed by Steve Ballmer, and the company was renamed Stagwell Technologies.

In 2018, Corsell co-founded HighDegree, a cybersecurity startup focused on reducing digital advertising fraud, which was acquired by IronNet, the publicly-traded cybersecurity company founded by General Keith Alexander in 2019.

Awards and affiliations
Corsell was listed by MIT Technology Review as one of the "top 35 innovators" in the world under the age of 35 in 2008.
 
In 2008, Corsell was named Chairman of the World Economic Forum's Global Agenda Council on Sustainable Energy.
 
In 2010, the World Economic Forum named Corsell a "Young Global Leader".

In 2015, the National Association of Corporate Directors (NACD) included Corsell on its
inaugural list of leading directors under 40.

Corsell currently serves on the Board of Directors at GridPoint, Atlantic Power & Utilities, and Fermata Energy, a vehicle-to-grid technology company, as well as on the Yale School of Architecture Dean’s Council and The Wolfsonian Museum in Miami Beach.

Author Thomas Friedman has claimed that the title for his 2016 book Thank You for Being Late was inspired by Corsell, who was late to a breakfast meeting with Friedman in 2015.

References

External links
 TFC Utilities
 The Stagwell Group
 GridPoint

Living people
American technology company founders
American energy industry executives
American chairpersons of corporations
21st-century American businesspeople
People of the Central Intelligence Agency
People from Brooklyn
Walsh School of Foreign Service alumni
1977 births